Komitas State Conservatory of Yerevan, also known as Yerevan Komitas State Conservatory (YKSC) or Yerevan State Conservatory (YSC), is a state-owned college of music located in Yerevan, Armenia. The institute was founded in 1921 as a music studio. In 1923, it was turned into a higher musical education institution. It is named after Komitas, the founder of the Armenian national school of music.

Student Council
The Student Council is self-governed and is formed of students from different study years, who are chosen in the faculty student meetings. The chairman is chosen by the council members. The Student Council is aimed to defend students' interests, help them to solve their social and life problems and organize their free time. The council provides financial aid, nominal scholarships and removes the study fee fully or partially. The chairman of the council is co-opted to the YSC Rectorate. The students also delegate 25% of the Student Council staff to the Big Council of the YSC.

Orchestra
The YSC has a permanent student symphony orchestra, chamber, and folk instruments orchestras, folklore choir and different chamber ensembles: trios, quartets, a wind sextet, etc.

The Opera Studio with its symphony orchestra and choir is situated in one of the YSC buildings. The Studio has at its disposal the Big Hall with theater stage (275 seats), where the studio participants, both teachers and students: producers, conductors, orchestra musicians and choir singers, stage the operas. All the vocal parts in these operas are performed by the students of the Vocal Department.

There are also three small concert halls in the Conservatory (80-100 seats in each one). They are used for the academic evenings, solo, class, faculty or jubilee recitals, annual session of the Top Student Society, student formal and informal meetings and "skills".

Rectors
Romanos Melikyan (1923-1924)
Arshak Adamian (1924-1926)
Anushavan Ter-Ghevondyan (1926-1930)
Spiridon Melikyan (1930-1931)
Snar Snarian (1931-1932)
Georgiy Hovhannisyan (1932-1933)
Vardan Samvelyan (1933-1936)
Konstantin Saradzhev (1936-1937)
Samson Gasparyan (1937-1940)
Konstantin Saradzhev (1947-1954)
Grigor Yeghiazaryan (1954-1960)
Ghazaros Saryan (1960-1986)
Edgar Hovhannisyan (1986-1992)
Tigran Mansurian (1992-1995)
Armen Smbatian (1995-2002)
Sergey Sarajyan (2002-2011)
Shahen Shahinyan (2011-2018)
Sona Hovhannisyan (2018-)

Notable alumni

Vartan Adjemian
Tatul Altunyan
Robert Amirkhanyan
Vahan Artsruni
Alexander Arutiunian
Anzhela Atabekyan
Khachatur Avetisyan
Mikael Avetisyan
Arno Babajanian
Vahram Babayan
Ani Batikian
Tsolak Bekaryan
Raffi Besalyan
Levon Chaushian
Geghuni Chitchian
Gevorg Dabaghyan
Arsen Grigoryan (Mro)
Tigran Hekekyan
Gagik Hovunts
David Khanjyan
Tigran Mansurian
Armen Martirosyan
Tigran Maytesian
Edvard Mirzoyan
Armen Movsessian
Iveta Mukuchyan
Svetlana Navasardyan
Hasmik Papian
Konstantin Petrossian
Tovmas Poghosyan
Heghine Rapyan
Stepan Rostomyan
Vardan Sardaryan
Gevorg Sargsyan
Ghazaros Saryan
Aram Satian
Regina Gurgenyan
David Satian
Vache Sharafyan
Gerard Jirayr Svazlian
Eduard Topchjan
Ara Torosyan
Anahit Tsitsikian
Julietta Vardanyan
William Weiner
Varduhi Yeritsyan
Samvel Yervinyan
Lusine Zakaryan
Mary Movsisyan
Tigran Mkrtchyan
 Vahagn Papayan
 Anahit Papayan

See also
 Sayat-Nova Music School

References

External links
 Yerevan State Musical Conservatory (YSC) official site

Komitas State Conservatory of Yerevan
Educational institutions established in 1923
Education in Yerevan
1923 establishments in the Soviet Union